Alviela River is a river in Portugal. The Alviela spring is one of the deepest in the world and is locally connected to a cave complex that represents the most significant fluvio-karstic phenomena in Portugal, one which supports several bat colonies with more than 5,000 bats in total.

The river has its origin in a karst spring. Ribeira dos Amiais, a losing stream, infiltrates through the Sumidouro da Ribeira dos Amiais, a ponor, only to return to the surface 250 m further on through a canyon.

References

Rivers of Portugal